NGC 3610 is an elliptical galaxy in the constellation Ursa Major. It was discovered on 8 April 1793 by William Herschel.

NGC 3610 was imaged by the Hubble Space Telescope in 2015. The image shows a prominent disk, a characteristic of spiral galaxies but not elliptical galaxies. Elliptical galaxies are thought to form from collisions with spiral galaxies; NGC 3610 is a relatively young elliptical galaxy which has still not lost its disk yet.

Gallery

References

External links
 

3610
Ursa Major (constellation)
Elliptical galaxies
06319
34556